The Spanish dollar, also known as the piece of eight (or ), is a silver coin of approximately  diameter worth eight Spanish reales. It was minted in the Spanish Empire following a monetary reform in 1497 with content 25.563 g = 0.822 oz t fine silver. It was widely used as the first international currency because of its uniformity in standard and milling characteristics. Some countries countermarked the Spanish dollar so it could be used as their local currency.

Because the Spanish dollar was widely used in Europe, the Americas, and the Far East, it became the first world currency by the late 18th century. 

The Spanish dollar was the coin upon which the original United States dollar was based (at 0.7735 oz t = 24.0566 g), and it remained legal tender in the United States until the Coinage Act of 1857. Many other currencies around the world, such as the Japanese yen and the Chinese yuan, were initially based on the Spanish dollar and other 8-real coins. Diverse theories link the origin of the "$" symbol to the columns and stripes that appear on one side of the Spanish dollar.

The term peso was used in Spanish to refer to this denomination, and it became the basis for many of the currencies in the former Spanish colonies, including the Argentine, Bolivian, Chilean, Colombian, Costa Rican, Cuban, Dominican, Ecuadorian, Guatemalan, Honduran, Mexican, Nicaraguan, Paraguayan, Philippine, Puerto Rican, Peruvian, Salvadoran, Uruguayan, and Venezuelan pesos. Of these, "peso" remains the name of the official currency in the Philippines, Mexico, Cuba, the Dominican Republic, Colombia, Chile, Argentina, and Uruguay.

History

Etymology

Europe and colonial North America
The  weighed 451 Troy grains (29.2 g = 0.94 oz t) of silver. So successful were these coins that similar s were minted in Burgundy and France. This coin was then succeeded by the long-lived Reichsthaler of the Holy Roman Empire, used from the 16th to 19th centuries, of 25.984 g = 0.8355 oz t pure silver.

The Netherlands also introduced its own dollars in the 16th century: the Burgundian Cross Thaler (Bourgondrische Kruisdaalder), the German-inspired Rijksdaalder, and the Dutch liondollar (leeuwendaalder). The latter coin was used for Dutch trade in the Middle East, in the Dutch East Indies and West Indies, and in the Thirteen Colonies of North America.

For the English North American colonists, however, the Spanish peso or "piece of eight" has always held first place, and this coin was also called the "dollar" as early as 1581. After the Declaration of American Independence, the United States dollar was introduced in 1792 at par with this coin at 371.25 grains = 0.7735 troy ounces = 24.0566 g. Alexander Hamilton arrived at these numbers based on a treasury assay of the average fine silver content of a selection of worn Spanish dollars.

The term cob was used in Ireland and the British colonies to mean a piece of eight or a Spanish-American dollar, because Spanish gold and silver coins were irregularly shaped and crudely struck before the machine-milled dollar was introduced in 1732.

Spain

After the introduction of the Guldengroschen in Austria in 1486, the concept of a large silver coin with high purity (sometimes known as "specie" coinage) eventually spread throughout the rest of Europe. Monetary reform in Spain brought about the introduction of an 8-real (or 1-peso) coin in 1497, minted to the following standards-
 In 1497:  dollars to a Castilian mark of silver (230.0465 grams),  or 0.9306 fine (25.563 g fine silver = 0.822 oz t)
 In 1728: $8.50 to a mark,  or 0.9167 fine (24.809 g fine silver = 0.798 oz t)
 In 1772: $8.50 to a mark,  or 0.9028 fine (24.443 g fine silver; but true fineness 1772–1821 believed to be only 0.89.

This was supplemented in 1537 by the gold escudo, minted at 68 to a mark of gold 0.917 fine (fineness reduced to 0.906 in 1742 and 0.875 in 1786). It was valued at 15–16 reales or approximately 2 dollars. The famed Gold Doubloon was worth 2 escudos or approximately 4 dollars.

From the 15th to the 19th centuries the coin was minted with several different designs at various mints in Spain and the New World, having gained wide acceptance beyond Spain's borders. Thanks to the vast silver deposits that were found mainly in Potosí in modern-day Bolivia and to a lesser extent in Mexico (for example, at Taxco and Zacatecas), and to silver from Spain's possessions throughout the Americas, mints in Mexico and Peru also began to strike the coin. The main New World mints for Spanish dollars were at Potosí, Lima, and Mexico City (with minor mints at Bogotá, Popayán, Guatemala City, and Santiago), and silver dollars from these mints could be distinguished from those minted in Spain by the Pillars of Hercules design on the reverse.

The dollar or peso was divided into 8 reales in Spanish Latin America until 19th century when the peso was divided instead into 100 centavos. However, monetary turbulence in Spain beginning under the reign of King Philip II resulted in the dollar being subdivided as follows in Spain only:
 Until 1642: $1 = 8 reales, subsequently called reales nacionales
 From 1642: $1 = 10 reales provinciales
 From 1687: $1 =  reales de vellón (made of billon alloy; edict not effective)
 From 1737: $1 = 20 reales de vellón 
 In 1864: $1 = 2 silver escudos (different from the gold escudo)
 And finally, in 1869: $1 = 5 Spanish pesetas, the latter at par with the French franc in the Latin Monetary Union.

Spain's adoption of the peseta in 1869 and its joining the Latin Monetary Union meant the effective end of the last vestiges of the Spanish dollar in Spain itself. However, the 5-peseta coin (or duro) was slightly smaller and lighter but was also of high purity (90%) silver.

In the 1990s, commemorative 2,000-peseta coins were minted, similar in size and weight to the dollar.

Mexico

Following independence in 1821, Mexican coinage of silver reales and gold escudos followed that of Spanish lines until decimalization and the introduction of the peso worth 8 reales or 100 centavos. It continued to be minted to Spanish standards throughout the 19th century, with the peso at 27.07 g of 0.9028 fine silver, and the escudo at 3.383 g of 0.875 fine gold. The Mexican peso or 8-real coin continued to be a popular international trading coin throughout the 19th century.

After 1918, the peso was reduced in size and fineness, with further reductions in the 1940s and 1950s. However, 2- (1921), 5- (1947) and 10- (1955) peso coins were minted during the same period with sizes and fineness similar to the old peso.

Australia
After the colony of New South Wales was founded in Australia in 1788, it ran into the problem of a lack of coinage, particularly since trading vessels took coins out of the colony in exchange for their cargo. In 1813, Governor Lachlan Macquarie made creative use of £10,000 in Spanish dollars sent by the British government. To make it difficult to take the coins out of the colony, and to double their number, the centres of the coins were punched out. The punched centre, known as the "dump", was valued at 15 pence, and the outer rim, known as the "holey dollar", was worth five shillings. This was indicated by overstamping the two new coins. The obverse of the holey dollar was stamped the words "New South Wales" and the date, 1813, and the reverse with the words "five shillings". The obverse of the dump was stamped with a crown, the words "New South Wales" and the date, 1813, and the reverse with the words "fifteen pence". The mutilated coins became the first official currency produced specifically for circulation in Australia. The expedient was relatively short lived. The British Parliament passed the Sterling Silver Money Act in 1825, which made British coins the only recognised form of currency and ended any legitimate use of the holey dollar and dump in the Australian colonies.

United States
The Coinage Act of 1792 created the United States Mint and initially defined the United States dollar at par with the Spanish dollar due to its international reputation:

By far the leading specie coin circulating in America was the Spanish silver dollar, defined as consisting of 387 grains of pure silver. The dollar was divided into "pieces of eight," or "bits," each consisting of one-eighth of a dollar. Spanish dollars came into the North American colonies through lucrative trade with the West Indies. The Spanish silver dollar had been the world's outstanding coin since the early 16th century, and was spread partially by dint of the vast silver output of the Spanish colonies in Latin America. More important, however, was that the Spanish dollar, from the 16th to the 19th century, was relatively the most stable and least debased coin in the Western world.

The Coinage Act of 1792 specified that the U.S. dollar would contain 371.25 grains (24.057 g) pure or 416 grains (26.96 g) standard silver. This specification was based on the average weight of a random selection of worn Spanish dollars which Alexander Hamilton ordered to be weighed at the Treasury. Initially this dollar was comparable to the 371–373 grains found in circulating Spanish dollars and aided in its exportation overseas. The restoration of the old 0.9028 fineness in the Mexican peso after 1821, however, increased the latter's silver content to 24.44 g and reduced the export demand for U.S. dollars.

Before the American Revolution, owing to British mercantilist policies, there was a chronic shortage of British currency in Britain's colonies. Trade was often conducted with Spanish dollars that had been obtained through illicit trade with the West Indies. Spanish coinage was legal tender in the United States until the Coinage Act of 1857 discontinued the practice. The pricing of equities on U.S. stock exchanges in -dollar denominations persisted until the New York Stock Exchange converted first to pricing in sixteenths of a dollar on 24 June 1997, and then in 2001 to decimal pricing.

Asia
Long tied to the lore of piracy, "pieces of eight" were manufactured in the Spanish Americas and transported in bulk back to Spain, making them a very tempting target for seagoing pirates. In the Far East, it also arrived in the form of the Philippine peso in the Philippines as part of the Spanish East Indies of the Spanish colonial empire through the Manila galleons that transported Mexican silver peso to Manila in the Manila-Acapulco Galleon Trade, where it would be exchanged for Philippine and Chinese goods, since silver was the only foreign commodity China would accept. In Oriental trade, Spanish dollars were often stamped with Chinese characters known as "chop marks" which indicated that particular coin had been assayed by a well-known merchant and determined to be genuine. The specifications of the Spanish dollar became a standard for trade in the Far East, with later Western powers issuing trade dollars, and colonial currencies such as the Hong Kong dollar, to the same specifications.

The first Chinese yuan coins had the same specification as a Spanish dollar, leading to a continuing equivalence in some respects between the names "yuan" and "dollar" in the Chinese language. Other currencies also derived from the dollar include the Japanese yen, Korean won, Philippine peso, Malaysian ringgit, French Indochinese piastre, etc since it was widely traded across the Far East in the East Indies and the East Asia.

Contemporary names used for Spanish dollars in Qing Dynasty China include běnyáng (本洋), shuāngzhù (双柱), zhùyáng (柱洋), fóyáng (佛洋), fótóu (佛頭), fóyín (佛銀), and fótóuyín (佛頭銀). The "fó" element in those Chinese names referred to the King of Spain in those coins, as his face resembled that of images of the Buddha (佛 in chinese); and the "zhù" part of those names referred to the two pillars in the Spanish coat of arms.

Fiction
In modern pop culture and fiction, pieces of eight are most often associated with the popular notion of pirates.

 In Robert Louis Stevenson's Treasure Island, Long John Silver's parrot had apparently been trained to cry out, "Pieces of eight!" This use tied the coin (and parrots) to fictional depictions of pirates. Deriving from the wide popularity of this book, "Pieces of eight" is sometimes used to mean "money" or "a lot of money", regardless of specific denomination, and also as a synonym for treasure in general.
 In Pirates of the Caribbean: At World's End the Pirate Lords must meet together by presenting the "Nine Pieces of Eight", since these Pieces were used to seal the goddess Calypso in her human form by the first Brethren Court. As the Pirate Lords were, at the time of sealing Calypso into her human form, too poor to offer real Spanish dollars, they opted to use personal talismans instead, except for the "ninth piece of eight" (Jack Sparrow's), which was an actual piece of eight that is hanging off his bandana in all movies, up to its destruction in the third film.
Pieces of Eight is the eighth studio album and second concept album by Styx, released on 1 September 1978.
 In Terry Pratchett's "Going Postal" the antagonist, Reacher Gilt had a cockatoo named Alphonse which had been trained to say "Twelve and half percent!", that is to say a single piece of eight.
 Pieces of Eight is used as a currency on Monkey Island (series)

See also

Doubloon
Columnarios
Holey dollar
Maria Theresa thaler
Piastre
Spanish escudo

References

Further reading
Hockenhull, Thomas (ed.), Symbols of Power: Ten Coins That Changed the World (British Museum, 2015): The Dollar (pp. 130–145).
Gordon, Peter and Morales, Juan José, The Silver Way: China, Spanish America and the Birth of Globalisation 1565–1815 (Penguin Special, 2017)

Ferdinand VII Holey Dollars

External links
History of the Real de a Ocho
 Hispan collections (archived 14 February 2009)
 HISPAN 1776 (archived 14 February 2009)
 Information on Columnarios
 The Colonial Coinage of Spanish America: An introduction by Daniel Frank Sedwick
 The 8 reales: the history of the 1st international coin that gave rise to almost all the world's currencies.

1497 establishments in Spain
Modern obsolete currencies
Dollar